The Omaha Vipers were a professional indoor soccer team that began play in the MISL in the 2010–11 season.  Based in Omaha, Nebraska, the Vipers played their home games at the Omaha Civic Auditorium. Following their inaugural season, the Vipers had planned moving from Major Indoor Soccer League to the Professional Arena Soccer League for the 2011–12 season and paid the league's $25,000 franchise fee, but the team folded in October 2011 when they were unable to secure an arena for the upcoming season.

Year-by-year

Final Squad
as of 16 November 2010

References

Association football clubs established in 2010
Defunct indoor soccer clubs in the United States
Major Indoor Soccer League (2008–2014) teams
Defunct soccer clubs in Nebraska
Defunct sports teams in Nebraska
Defunct Professional Arena Soccer League teams
Sports in Omaha, Nebraska
2010 establishments in Nebraska
2011 disestablishments in Nebraska
Association football clubs disestablished in 2011